Scorpio is a 1981 song by Grandmaster Flash and the Furious Five, released in 1982 as a single from their album ‘’The Message’’ (1982). It reached #30 on the R&B Singles chart and #77 on the UK Singles Chart. It was dubbed the "greatest early electro track" by Mark Richardson in his album review for Pitchfork Media. The track was named after one of the members of the group, rapper Scorpio (Eddie Morris aka Mr. Ness).

Track listing
Promo version
 Scorpio – 5:10
 Scorpio – 5:10

Other versions
 Scorpio – 3:03 or 4:50 (dependent on version)
 It's A Shame (Mt. Airy Groove) – 4:58

Personnel
Producer – Jigsaw Prod., Sylvia Robinson
Written by – The Furious Five

References

1982 singles
1982 songs
Electro songs
Sugar Hill Records (Hip-Hop label) singles
Songs about dancing